Following is a list of sports governing bodies in Turkey. All sport federations in Turkey are organized under the governmental agency, Youth and Sport Administration (GSGM), which is the highest umbrella organization for sports.

References

Sports governing bodies in Turkey
governing bodies